is a 13-episode Japanese anime television series created and written by Naoki Hisaya and produced by . The series aired in Japan between October 5 and December 28, 2014. A short original video animation episode was released on July 24, 2015. A manga adaptation illustrated by Yuka Namisaki was serialized in ASCII Media Works' Dengeki Daioh magazine.

Plot
Nonoka Komiya is a girl who once lived in Lake Kiriya City, based on Lake Tōya in Hokkaido, where she met a blue-haired girl named Noel. Seven years later, Nonoka returns to the city, which now has a mysterious saucer floating above it, and reunites with Noel, who promises to grant her wish.

Characters
 

The protagonist who returns to Lake Kiriya after having moved away seven years before. She has lived with her father since her mother died due to an undisclosed illness.

 

A mysterious blue-haired girl whom Nonoka first met seven years ago. She is eventually revealed to be the saucer itself, which Nonoka and her friends had called down.

 

An energetic girl who has a strong dislike for the saucer. She also seems to be on bad terms with her twin brother, Sōta.

 

An airheaded girl who works as a poster girl for a local shop devoted to the saucer.

 

A stern girl who enjoys photography. She was once Nonoka's best friend but grew to hate her after she moved away without letting anyone know.

 

Yuzuki's twin brother who has feelings for Koharu.

Media

Manga
A manga adaptation, written by Naoki Hisaya and illustrated by Yuka Namisaki, was serialized in ASCII Media Works' Dengeki Daioh magazine between the October 2014 and March 2015 issues with the series left unfinished. It was later reported in the December 2015 issue that the serialization had ended due to circumstances with the author. One tankōbon volume was released on October 27, 2014.

Anime
The series is directed by Masayuki Sakoi and written by Naoki Hisaya, with music by Tatsuya Kato and character designs by QP:flapper, consisting of duo artists Koharu Sakura and Tometa Ohara. An original video animation (OVA) episode was included on the seventh Blu-ray/DVD volume released on July 24, 2015. A special episode premiered on October 11, 2019 on the Infinite YouTube channel. Sentai Filmworks has licensed the series for release in North America.

References

External links
 

3Hz
2014 anime television series debuts
2014 manga
2014 Japanese television series endings
Japanese adult animated fantasy television series
Anime with original screenplays
ASCII Media Works manga
Dengeki Daioh
Sentai Filmworks
Shōnen manga
Fantasy anime and manga
Anime and manga set in Hokkaido